Bryan Edward Quarles van Ufford (27 May 1920, Semarang, Dutch East Indies — 21 September 1975 Leiden) was a diplomat from the Netherlands. As of 1972, he was Dutch ambassador to Luxembourg.  Later he served as the leader of the Dutch delegation to the Mutual and Balanced Force Reductions (MBFR) exploratory talks in Vienna in early 1973.

References 

1920 births
1975 deaths
Ambassadors of the Netherlands to Luxembourg
People from Semarang
Dutch expatriates in Austria
Dutch people of the Dutch East Indies